The Saint Peter's Peacocks baseball team is a varsity intercollegiate athletic team of Saint Peter's University in Jersey City, New Jersey, United States. The team is a member of the Metro Atlantic Athletic Conference, which is part of the National Collegiate Athletic Association's Division I. The team plays its home games at Joseph J. Jaroschak Field in Jersey City, New Jersey. The Peacocks are coached by head coach Grant Neary.

Head Coaches

Records are through the end of the 2021 season

Taken from the Saint Peter's Baseball 2020 Record Book

Major League Baseball
Saint Peter's has had 8 Major League Baseball Draft selections since the draft began in 1965.

See also
List of NCAA Division I baseball programs

References

External links